Hassan Ilham is a Maldivian singer.

Career
Ilham made his career debut in the late 1990s though his professional career is noted to be initiated in the year 2000 with the studio album Hamaroalhi where he rendered ten songs for it. The following year, he released the song "Yaaraage Moonu Ma Dhusheemey" from the album Mendhan and "Rey Nidheegaa E Fenunu HUvafeneh" from the album Huvafen, which were marked as his breakthrough performances in his career. The song being a chartbuster leads him to be a prominent voice in the industry where several music directors and producers roped him to lend his voice for several upcoming film releases and studio albums.

In 2010, Ilham appeared as a vocal coach in the local singing reality show Voice of Maldives for its two seasons. Though all his participants get eliminated early in the competition in its first season, the following season was a fruitful challenge for him, where the title was awarded to one of his participants. Afterwards, he slowly disappeared from the music scene though he collaborates few film releases including Naughty 40 (2017) and Kos Gina Mistake (2021). At the 2nd Maldives Film Awards ceremony, Ilham was bestowed with the Best Male Playback Singer award for his soulful and emotional rendition of the song "Kalaa Beevumun" from the film Dhin Veynuge Hithaamaigaa (2010). Nominations for the major categories were announced on 25 June 2012. In 2018, Ilham was ranked third in the list of the "Most Desired Comeback Voices", compiled by Dho?.

Discography

Feature film

Short film

Television

Non-film songs

Accolades

References 

Living people
People from Malé
Maldivian playback singers
Year of birth missing (living people)